Edward Partridge Kimball (June 2, 1882 – March 15, 1937) was an American organist of the Mormon Tabernacle Choir and a Latter-day Saint hymn writer.

In 1898 Kimball was appointed music teacher at the Beaver Branch of Brigham Young Academy. From April 11, 1902 to April 1906, Kimball served as a missionary for the Church of Jesus Christ of Latter-day Saints (LDS Church) in Germany.

Kimball was either the organist or assistant organist of the Mormon Tabernacle Choir from 1905 to 1937. Kimball was the organist when Music and the Spoken Word was begun.  His son, Ted Kimball, was the first announcer for the show.

Kimball wrote the words to "God Loved Us, So He Sent His Son" and the music to "Great God, To Thee My Evening Song" and "The Wintry Day Descending to a Close", all of which are in the 1985 English language edition of the LDS Church hymnal.

Kimball took a leave from his active service as Mormon Tabernacle organist to serve as president of the LDS Church's German–Austrian Mission.

In 1933, Kimball was appointed organist and director of the church's Bureau of Information in Washington, D. C., where he also served as a lecturer and guide. While in this role, Kimball died following a brief illness in 1937.

References 

1882 births
1937 deaths
20th-century Mormon missionaries
20th-century classical musicians
American Latter Day Saint hymnwriters
American Mormon missionaries in Austria
American Mormon missionaries in Germany
American leaders of the Church of Jesus Christ of Latter-day Saints
American male organists
Brigham Young Academy faculty
Mission presidents (LDS Church)
Tabernacle Choir organists
20th-century American male musicians
Male classical organists
American organists